David Frederick Lindsay (9 December 1906 – 7 March 1978) was a New Zealand rugby union player. A utility back, Lindsay played in positions from five-eighth to fullback. He represented  at a provincial level, and was a member of the New Zealand national side, the All Blacks, on their 1928 tour of South Africa. On that tour he was the first-choice fullback, and played 11 matches including three of the four internationals.

Lindsay practised as a dentist in Timaru and Invercargill, and later worked at Timaru Hospital. He continued his involvement in rugby, and was a  selector in 1945 and 1946. He was a cousin of Olympic swimmer David Lindsay. The Lindsay Wing, part of the accommodation for boarders at Timaru Boys' High School, is named in honour of the two cousins who both attended the school.

Lindsay died in Timaru on 7 March 1978, and was buried at Timaru Cemetery.

References

1906 births
1978 deaths
People from South Canterbury
People educated at Timaru Boys' High School
University of Otago alumni
New Zealand rugby union players
New Zealand international rugby union players
Otago rugby union players
Rugby union fullbacks
New Zealand dentists
New Zealand sports executives and administrators
Burials at Timaru Cemetery
Rugby union players from Canterbury, New Zealand